Allan Charles "Huck" Woodman (March 11, 1899 – April 17, 1963) was a Canadian ice hockey player who competed in the 1920 Summer Olympics. He was born in Winnipeg, Manitoba.

He was a member for the Winnipeg Falcons, the Canadian team which won the gold medal in the 1920 Olympics. Woodman was the only player on the team not of Icelandic descent. He died in Winnipeg, Manitoba.

Awards and achievements
Allan Cup Championship (1920)
Olympic Gold Medalist (1920)

References

External links
 
Allan Woodman's biography at databaseOlympics.com
Falcons

1899 births
1963 deaths
Canadian people of Ukrainian descent
Ice hockey players at the 1920 Summer Olympics
Medalists at the 1920 Summer Olympics
Olympic gold medalists for Canada
Olympic ice hockey players of Canada
Olympic medalists in ice hockey
Ice hockey people from Winnipeg
Winnipeg Falcons players